Rassvet is a rural locality (a settlement) and the administrative center of Rassvetenskoye Rural Settlement, Leninsky District, Volgograd Oblast, Russia. The population was 684 as of 2010. There are 11 streets.

Geography 
The village is located on Caspian Depression, on the left bank of the Volga River, 96 km from Volgograd, 62 km from Leninsk.

References 

Rural localities in Leninsky District, Volgograd Oblast